Peel is an MP3 blog reader/player/browser for macOS. After you input an MP3 blog's URL, Peel generates a playlist of the available songs. From there, the user is able to listen to the songs, download the songs, and copy them into iTunes.

The program also has a built in web browser for viewing an MP3 blog's website without switching applications.

External links
MP3 Blog listing at MonkeyFilter
Music Blog Wiki

macOS media players